The 1963 Victorian Football League (VFL) season was the sixty-seventh season of the VFL. The season saw 113 Australian rules footballers make their senior VFL debut and three players transferring to new clubs having previously played in the VFL.

Summary

Debuts

References

Australian rules football records and statistics
Australian rules football-related lists
1963 in Australian rules football